The following list is a discography of production by AraabMuzik.

2006

The Diplomats - More Than Music Vol. 2
01. "Intro" (performed by 40 Cal. & DukeDaGod)

2007

Hell Rell - For the Hell of It
01. "Intro"
11. "I'm the Shit" (featuring Cam'ron) 
12. "Respect Me" (featuring J.R. Writer)

2008

Hell Rell - Black Mask, Black Gloves
01. "Intro (Black Gloves)"
02. "Get Ready" (featuring Shane O Mac) 
04. "Think of A Problem"
11. "Rumors"

2009

Starrs & Murph – Boxes for Sale
05. "Dolla Bills" (featuring Jane Nithrow)
06. "Money Over Here" (featuring Vic Damone)
10. "My Life"
12. "Marry You" (featuring Naledge)
14. "Loaded Gun"

Dub – FMM2: Family, Money, Music 2
00. Red Dot (featuring Cory Gunz & Young Hash)

Cam'ron - Crime Pays
06. "Curve"
 Sample Credit: Manfred Mann's Earth Band - "For You"
08. "Get It in Ohio"  
12. "Spend the Night" (featuring Lady Lodi)
 Sample Credit: Kay Cee - "Escape"
15. "Chalupa"

J.R. Writer - Cinecrack 
08. "Extermination" (featuring Hell Rell) 
09. "Gorilla Musik"

Willy Northpole - Tha Connect
08. "Skit (Ghetto Tour Guide)"

2010

DJ Kayslay - More Than Just a DJ
05. "Monster Music" (featuring Cam'ron & Vado)

Capone-N-Noreaga - The War Report 2: Report the War
13. "Scarface"

Cam'ron & The U.N. - Heat In Here Vol. 1
1. "Intro"
2. "Like Shiiiiit"
3. "Throw It Up"
4. "Its Your Party"
6. "Butta"
7. "Fuck The Other Side"
8. "Cuffin" (featuring Gucci Mane)
9. "Fed Story"
11. "Horror Story"
12. "On My Shiznit"
13. "La Bumba"
14. "Ride With Me"

2011

Jim Jones - Capo
07. "Drops Is Out" (featuring Raekwon, Mel Matrix & Sen City)   
16. "Salute" (featuring Cam'ron & Juelz Santana) (Bonus Track)

Cam'ron & Vado - Gunz n' Butta
01. "Killa"
02. "American Greed" 
03. "Heat in Here"
04. "Face-Off vmo"
05. "I-Luv U"
06. "Put A Bird Up"
07. "Monster Muzik"
10. "Lights, Camera, Action" (featuring Skylynn) 
11. "Stop It 5"
14. "We All Up in Here"
15. "Be With Me"

Lungz - DreamKillaz
15. "Get in Tune" (featuring Mic Terror) (Bonus Track)

Tuge - The Scrimmage
17. "Rapper Down" (featuring Sean-Don & G-Eyez)

Lloyd Banks - The Cold Corner 2
01. "1,2,3 Grind" (featuring Prodigy)
Leftover
00. "Love Me in the Hood"

Styles P - Master of Ceremonies
04. "Ryde on da Regular"

Tragedy Khadafi - Thug Matrix 3
01. "Narcotic Lines"

Various artists - America's Most Hated
04. "Presidential Rolex" (performed by Vado, C Nellz & Jae Millz)

Bushido - Jenseits von Gut und Böse
05. "Gesucht und gefunden"

2012

50 Cent - The Lost Tape
03. "Murder One" (featuring Eminem)

Slaughterhouse - Welcome to: Our House
05. "Hammer Dance"

ASAP Mob - Lords Never Worry
08. "Dope, Money and Hoes"
10. "Y.N.R.E."

Styles P - The World’s Most Hardest MC Project
02. "Araab Styles"

Swizz Beatz - Haute Living
 "Street Knock" (featuring ASAP Rocky)

Joe Budden - A Loose Quarter
02. "Words of a Chameleon"
05. "Through My Eyes" (featuring Tsu-Surf)
09. "So Good" (featuring Emanny)

Fabolous - The S.O.U.L. Tape 2
11. "Beauty" (featuring Wale)

Various artists - Fool's Gold Presents: Loosies
03. "Molly Ringwald" (performed by Danny Brown)

2013

Funkmaster Flex - Who You Mad At? Me or Yourself?
02. "Money Talks" (performed by Fabolous)

Nacho Picasso - Vampsterdam
00. "Vampire" (featuring Avatar Darko)

Apache Chief - Upstate of Mind
01. "Here To Stay"

Chase N. Cashe - Charm
09. "Ransom Note"

Hype Holla - HYPEothetically
01. "My City"
02. "Welcome to Rhode Island"
03. "Get It Started"
04. "Right Here"
06. "Ends Tonight"
08. "Hands Up" (featuring Freeway)
09. "Southside"
10. "Pain In My Eyes"
11. "Over There" (featuring Bankoz)

Hype Holla & Writes - #team401
02. "Monster"

Mt Eden - Sierra Leone (Feat. Freshly Ground) [Remixes] - EP
03. "Sierra Leone Feat. Freshly Ground AraabMuzik Remix"

Troy Ave - New York City: The Album
15. "Regretful"

2014

Slaughterhouse - House Rules
05. "Keep It 100"
09. "I Ain't Bullshittin'"

Azealia Banks - Broke With Expensive Taste
09. "Ice Princess"

2015

Various artists - Southpaw (Music from and Inspired By the Motion Picture)
07. "R.N.S." (performed by Slaughterhouse) (produced with Just Blaze)

Joe Budden - All Love Lost
06. "Love, I'm Good" (co-produced by Karon Graham)
08. "Slaughtermouse"

Lloyd Banks - Halloween Havoc 2
02. "Angel Dust"

Fabolous - Summertime Shootout
11. "Started Something" (featuring Daphne Larue)

2016

Royce da 5'9" - Tabernacle: Trust the Shooter
06. "The Banjo" (featuring Westside Gunn, Conway & Styles P)

Fabolous - Summertime Shootout 2: The Level Up
06. "4AM Flex" (featuring Tory Lanez)
12. "Ah Man" (produced with !llmind)

Torii Wolf - Flow Riiot
05. "Body"

Joe Budden - Rage & The Machine
01. "Three"
02. "Uncle Joe"
03. "Serious" (featuring Joell Ortiz)
04. "By Law" (featuring Jazzy)
05. "Flex" (featuring Tory Lanez & Fabolous)
06. "Forget"
07. "I Gotta Ask"
08. "Time for Work" (featuring Emanny)
09. "Wrong One"
10. "I Wanna Know" (featuring Stacy Barthe)
11. "Idols"

2018

Kollegah – Monument
 01. "Orbit (Intro)"
 02. "Dear Lord"
 03. "Blow Out"
 04. "Royal"
 06. "Bossmove"
 07. "Gospel"
 10. "La Vida Koka"
 11. "Makiaveli"
 12. "Realtalk"
 13. "Continental" (featuring Nas)
 14. "Donlife" (featuring Cam'ron)
 15. "Cohiba Symphony"

Kollegah – Hoodtape Volume 3
 26. "Testament"

2018

Swizz Beatz − Poison
04. "Something Dirty/Pic Got Us" 
08. "25 Soldiers"

2019

Fabolous − Summertime Shootout 3: Coldest Summer Ever
 01. "Cold Summer" 
 12. "Insecure"

2020

The Lox − Living Off Xperience
 01. "Gave It to Em" (produced with Swizz Beatz)

Jay Electronica − A Written Testimony
 03. "The Blinding" (featuring Jay-Z and Travis Scott) (produced with Hit-Boy)

References
General

Specific

 
Discographies of American artists
Production discographies